The Stockholm Ladies Cup, or the Stockholm Ladies Curling Cup is an annual bonspiel, or curling tournament, that takes place at the Danderyd Curling Arena in Stockholm, Sweden. The tournament is held in a round robin with straight playoff format. This change was made in 2014 from a triple-knockout format. The tournament was started in 2005 and became a Curling Champions Tour event, now part of the World Curling Tour.

Past champions
Only skip's name is displayed.

References

External links

Danderyds Curling AB Home Page

Stockholm Ladies Cup
Champions Curling Tour events